Edit DeAk (formerly deAk; ; September 16, 1948 – June 9, 2017) was a Hungarian-born American art critic and writer, co-founder of the journal Art-Rite and the non-profit bookstore and artist book distributor, Printed Matter, Inc.

Early life and education 
DeAk was born Edit Deak in Budapest, Hungary, to Elvira (née Csutkai) and Béla Deak.

In 1968, DeAk escaped Communist Hungary in the trunk of a car into Yugoslavia. She and her husband, Peter Grosz, eventually came to New York City via Italy.

In 1972, DeAk received a B.A. in Art History from Columbia University.

Career 
After taking an art criticism class taught by Brian O'Doherty, DeAk, and two fellow Columbia students—Walter Robinson and Joshua Cohn—were invited to write for the publication Art in America, where O'Doherty was an editor. DeAk was initially puzzled that an established publication wanted to recruit "baby blood," though she, Robinson, and Cohn still wrote for Art in America. However, DeAk and her cohorts eventually dreamed of starting their own magazine, and proposed ideas of printing a newspaper insert in Art in America. DeAk, Robinson, and Cohn later enrolled in the Whitney Independent Study Program, where the idea to publish a magazine resurfaced. Thus, the art magazine Art-Rite was founded in 1973.

In its conception, DeAk aimed for Art-Rite to have "a whole new tone and attitude," by addressing issues with humor and promoting unconventional forms of art, such as street art and performance art. Furthermore, DeAk and her colleagues created a very symbiotic relationship between Art-Rite and the artistic community, as the magazines were freely given away, "in recognition of the community which nurtures it.”

In 1974, DeAk initiated a series dedicated to video, performance art, and readings at the Artists Space gallery, where she was working as a part-time assistant. 

In 1976, while Art-Rite was still regularly published, DeAk, along with Robinson, Sol LeWitt, Carl Andre, Lucy Lippard, Pat Steir, Irena Von Zahn, Mimi Wheeler, and Robin White, founded the art space, organization, and publication company Printed Matter Inc.

DeAk wrote for many New York-based arts magazines. Through their connection and close association at Printed Matter, Inc, DeAk wrote articles for Artforum editor in chief, Ingrid Sischy, as well as for Interview, ZG, Art Random, among others.

Personal life 
At the age of 18, DeAk  married an artist named Peter Grosz, who later was known as Peter Grass. They eventually divorced.

The penultimate decades of DeAk's life were plague with poor health heavy drug use. At the age of 68, DeAk died of pneumonia and acute respiratory stress syndrome-related complications in New York City.

Works and publications 
  – Art Random, no. 15
 
 
  – Exhibition from February 28, 1984 to April 1, 1984

See also 
 Art-Rite

References

Further reading

External links 
 Edit DeAk at Printed Matter, Inc

1948 births
2017 deaths
Hungarian emigrants to the United States
American art critics
People from Budapest
Deaths from pneumonia in New York City